Dahaneh-ye Gomrokan (also Romanized as Dahaneh-ye Gomrokān and Dahaneh Gomrokān; also known as Dahaneh-ye Gomrūkān) is a village in Amjaz Rural District, in the Central District of Anbarabad County, Kerman Province, Iran. At the 2006 census, its population was 629, in 171 families.

References 

Populated places in Anbarabad County